Milo Township is a township in Delaware County, Iowa, USA.  As of the 2000 census, its population was 1,233.

Geography
Milo Township covers an area of 35.49 square miles (91.91 square kilometers); of this, 0.46 square miles (1.19 square kilometers) or 1.29 percent is water. The streams of Sand Creek, Spring Branch, Todds Creek and Turtle Creek run through this township.

Cities and towns
 Manchester (south edge)

Unincorporated towns
 Golden
(This list is based on USGS data and may include former settlements.)

Adjacent townships
 Delaware Township (north)
 Oneida Township (northeast)
 Delhi Township (east)
 Union Township (southeast)
 Hazel Green Township (south)
 Adams Township (southwest)
 Prairie Township (west)

Cemeteries
The township contains six cemeteries: Baileys Ford, Hamblin, Lillibridge, Milo Township, Sands Farm and Spring Branch.

Major highways
 U.S. Route 20

References
 U.S. Board on Geographic Names (GNIS)
 United States Census Bureau cartographic boundary files

External links
 US-Counties.com
 City-Data.com

Townships in Delaware County, Iowa
Townships in Iowa